Eociconia is an extinct genus of primitive stork, and one of the earliest members of Ciconiiformes. The holotype, which is a metatarsus, was found in Yixibaila Formation of Xinjiang, China, dated back to the Eocene period.

References
 ig. 5. Distal end of the tarsometatarsus. A. " Ciconiiform " bird Sanshuiornis zhangi gen. et sp. nov. , Researchgate.net

Eocene birds
Ciconiiformes
Paleontology in Xinjiang
Fossil taxa described in 1989
Prehistoric bird genera